Shah Muhammad or Shah Mohammad may refer to:

People 
 Shah Muhammad Sagir, Muslim Bengali poet during the reign of Ghiyasuddin Azam Shah, 1390–1411
 Shah Mohammad (1780–1862), Punjabi poet best known for Jangnama
 Shah Muhammad Sulaiman (1886–1941), Chief Justice of the Allahabad High Court, 1932–1937
 Shah Muhammad Rais (born 1954), subject of Åsne Seierstad's book The Bookseller of Kabul
 Sha Mohammed Alikhel (born 1981), Pakistani baker held in Guantanamo Bay 2001–2003
 Shah Muhammad Khan, Pakistani politician

 Shah Muhammad Kara Koyunlu - Kara Koyunlu prince, governor of Baghdad

Places 
 Shah Mohammad Qasemi, village in Hirmand County, Sistan and Baluchestan Province, Iran
 Shāh Moḩammad or Shirdel Sadak, village in Hirmand County, Sistan and Baluchestan Province, Iran

See also 
 Muhammad Shah (disambiguation)
 Sultan Muhammad Shah (disambiguation)